The Men's C1 at the 2021 ICF Canoe Slalom World Championships took place on 23 and 26 September 2021 at the Čunovo Water Sports Centre in Bratislava. It was the 41st edition of the event, and 53 athletes from 27 nations competed.

The event was won by Václav Chaloupka of the Czech Republic, competing in his first World Championships. Slovak Alexander Slafkovský won silver, matching his position from 2013 and 2017, whilst 2018 World Champion Franz Anton won bronze.

Background
Reigning World Champion Cédric Joly did not have the opportunity to defend his title won in La Seu d'Urgell in 2019, after he missed out on domestic selection. World No. 1 and Tokyo bronze-medallist Sideris Tasiadis also didn't compete. Benjamin Savšek entered the event as Olympic Champion and had the opportunity to become the first male to become World and Olympic Champion in the same calendar year. Frenchman Denis Gargaud Chanut came into the event having won two World Cup rounds en route to his first overall World Cup title. Gargaud Chanut also won the European Championships this year and the 2011 World Championships on this course. Host nation Slovakia also fielded a strong team, with World No. 2 Alexander Slafkovský and No. 4 Matej Beňuš.

Competition format
The Men's C1 event in canoe slalom uses a three-round format with heats, a semifinal and final. Athletes complete up to two runs in the heats. In the first heat, the 20 fastest men qualify automatically for the semifinal, whilst the rest complete another run in the repêchage second heat for a further 10 qualification positions. The final rank of non-qualifying athletes is determined by their second run score. Athletes start in the reverse order of their heats position in the semifinal and complete a single run, with the top 10 advancing to the final. The athlete with the best time in the single-run final is awarded gold.

Penalties of 2 or 50 seconds are incurred for infractions such as missing a gate, touching a gate, or not negotiating gates in numerical order. A team may request up to one review of a penalty per boat in the heats or semifinals phases, with no enquiries considered in the finals.

Schedule
All times are Central European Summer Time (UTC+2)

Results
Home favourite Alexander Slafkovský topped the first heat with a clean 83.96, more than 2 seconds clear of next best Olympic Champion Benjamin Savšek. Pole Kacper Sztuba won the second heat, 3.03 off Slafkovský's first run time. Martin Thomas and Raffaello Ivaldi were the two highest ranked athletes to miss out on the semifinal. 26 of the 30 who progressed to the semifinal did so with a penalty-free run.

Savšek finished fastest in the semifinal with a time of 91.18, ahead of 2018 World Champion Franz Anton and Slafkovský.

Václav Chaloupka became the 2021 C1M World Champion with a clean run of 92.02, the first to become both Senior and U23 World Champion in this event. Slafkovský won silver, just 0.15 seconds behind Chaloupka due to a touch on the penultimate gate, whilst Anton won bronze. Savšek appeared set to win the event before a mistake at the bottom of the course which incurred him a 50-second penalty.

Penalties are included in the time shown. The fastest time in each round is shown in bold.

References

ICF Canoe Slalom World Championships
World Championships
ICF
International sports competitions hosted by Slovakia
Sport in Bratislava
Canoeing in Slovakia
ICF